The Red Book of Azerbaijan is an official state document on the status of rare and endangered species of wild animals and plants in Azerbaijan. It contains information about the state, distribution and protection measures of animal and plant species within the Republic, including the section of the Caspian Sea belonging to Azerbaijan.

Description 
According to the legislation, the Red Book is planned to be published every 10 years. The first edition was published in 1989. It listed 108 species of animals and 140 species of plants.

Species are placed in one of 2 categories: endangered or rare. Endangered species are those that have sustained a substantial decrease in population and range and have reached a crisis level. Species with populations that are trending downward and are found in localized areas are considered rare. Animals and plants that are little studied, lack the necessary information about their number and resources in nature, and cause certain difficulties in the organization of their protection are also considered rare species.

Second edition 
Although the legislation states a new edition should be published every ten years, the second edition of the book was delayed by 24 years. It was finally published in 2013. Under the leadership of academic Jalal Aliyev, the second edition reflects the study of rare and endangered species of plants, fungi, and fauna distributed within Azerbaijan. This edition published information on 300 higher and primitive plants, as well as fungi and 223 fauna species, their distribution, number and population trends.

The second edition of the Red Book provides information about the species of flora and fauna of the Republic that need protection. Of the 300 species included in the list, 266 belong to higher plants, 20 belong to primitive plants (6 algae, 13 sedges and 1 moss) and 14 to fungi. Among higher plants, there are six species of pteridophytes, four species of gymnosperms, and 256 species of angiosperms.

See also
List of Red Lists

References

External links
 redbook.az 
 "Red Book" of the Republic of Azerbaijan 

Azerbaijani-language books
1989 books
Environment of Azerbaijan
1989 establishments in Azerbaijan